4 Andromedae, abbreviated 4 And, is a single star in the northern constellation of Andromeda. 4 Andromedae is the Flamsteed designation. It is dimly visible to the naked eye with an apparent visual magnitude of 5.308. The star is moving closer with a heliocentric radial velocity of −11 km/s. It has a magnitude 11.7 visual companion at an angular separation of  along a position angle of 348°, as of 2002.

At the age of 2.2 billion years, this is an aging giant star with a stellar classification of K5 III, having consumed the hydrogen at its core and evolved away from the main sequence. It has 1.6 times the mass of the Sun and has expanded to 26 times the Sun's radius. The star is radiating 170 times the Sun's luminosity from its enlarged photosphere at an effective temperature of 4,275 K.

References

External links
 Image 4 Andromedae

K-type giants
04 Andromedae
Durchmusterung objects
Andromedae, 04
218452
114200
8804